The Roman Catholic Archdiocese of Florencia is an archdiocese located in the city of Florencia, Caquetá in Colombia.

On Saturday, April 27, 2013, Pope Francis appointed the Very Reverend Father Omar de Jesús Mejía Giraldo, a priest of the Roman Catholic Diocese of Sonsón - Rionegro, Colombia, who up until then had been serving as rector of the national major seminary "Christ the Priest" in La Ceja, Colombia, as the sixth ordinary and fourth Bishop of the Roman Catholic Diocese of Florencia.

He succeeded Bishop Jorge Alberto Ossa Soto, who had served from 2003 until his July 2011 appointment by Pope Benedict XVI as bishop of the Roman Catholic Diocese of Santa Rosa de Osos in Santa Rosa de Osos, Colombia.

On July 13, 2019, Florencia was raised to Metropolitan Archdiocese, so Bishop Mejía Giraldo became an Archbishop then.

Biography of Archbishop Mejia Giraldo 
Archbishop Mejia Giraldo was born in El Santuario, Colombia, located within the Roman Catholic Diocese of Sonsón - Rionegro, on January 21, 1966. He was ordained to the priesthood on November 16, 1991, having studied the requisite undergraduate philosophy and graduate theology studies at the national major seminary "Christ the Priest" in La Ceja, Colombia, the same one where he would later serve as rector.

He then earned a licentiate of sacred philosophy and religious studies (the S.P.L. degree) at the "Universidad Católica de Oriente" (Spanish: "Catholic University of the Orient") in Rionegro, Colombia, and then also a Licentiate of Sacred Theology in dogmatic theology (the S.T.L. degree) from the Pontifical Gregorian University (the Gregorian, or the "Greg") in Rome, Italy.

He has held the following positions: trainer at the diocesan seminary "Nuestra Señora"; diocesan delegate for youth ministry and vocation ministry; parochial vicar (associate pastor, or curate), in the Parish of "Nuestra Señora del Carmen", in El Carmen de Viboral, Colombia; director of the Department for pastoral care in 
"Universidad Católica de Oriente" (Spanish: "Catholic University of the Orient") of Rionegro, Colombia; parochial vicar of the Parish "Madre de la Sabiduría"; vice-rector of the national seminary "Christ the Priest" in La Ceja and, starting 2008, rector of the national seminary "Christ the Priest" in La Ceja.

He was appointed Bishop of Florencia in 2013 and elevated to Archbishop in 2019.

History
 8 February 1951: Established as Apostolic Vicariate of Florencia from the Apostolic Vicariate of Caquetá
 9 December 1985: Promoted as Diocese of Florencia
 13 July 2019: Elevated as Archdiocese of Florencia

Ordinaries
 Vicars Apostolic of Florencia 
Antonio Torasso, I.M.C. (1952.01.10 – 1960.10.22)
Angelo Cuniberti, I.M.C. (1961.04.18 – 1978.11.15)
José Luis Serna Alzate, I.M.C. (1978.11.15 – 1985.12.09)
 Bishops of Florencia  
José Luis Serna Alzate, I.M.C. (1985.12.09 – 1989.07.08), appointed Bishop of Líbano-Honda
Fabián Marulanda López (1989.12.22 – 2002.07.19)
Jorge Alberto Ossa Soto (2003.01.21 – 2011.07.15), appointed Bishop of the Roman Catholic Diocese of Santa Rosa de Osos by Pope Benedict XVI
 Omar de Jesús Mejía Giraldo (2013.04.27 – 2019.07.13); elevated to Metropolitan Archbishop
 Archbishops of Florencia
 Omar de Jesús Mejía Giraldo (since 2019.07.13)

Suffragan dioceses
Diocese of Mocoa–Sibundoy  
Diocese of San Vicente del Caguán

See also
Roman Catholicism in Colombia

Sources

External links
 Catholic Hierarchy
 GCatholic.org
  Diocese website

Roman Catholic dioceses in Colombia
Roman Catholic Ecclesiastical Province of Florencia
Christian organizations established in 1951
Roman Catholic dioceses and prelatures established in the 20th century
Florencia, Caquetá
1951 establishments in Colombia